SOS HGS Gandaki is one among the two schools located in Pokhara, Nepal. The school runs classes from Nursery to Higher Secondary. It also provides various scholarships to the children of local community children. The school is providing the Higher Education in the science stream. There are 781 students and out of which 644 students come from local community.

References

Schools in Nepal
Schools in Pokhara